Two ships of the Estonian Navy have been named Kalev:

 , a  launched in 1936 and taken over by the Soviet Union in 1940; she was sunk  in the following year
 , a  previously Minerva in the German Navy she was acquired by Estonia in 1997 and renamed Kalev. Decommissioned in 2004 and became a museum ship 

Ship names